Ashburton is a wealthy, predominantly African-American neighborhood in the Forest Park region of northwestern Baltimore City, Maryland. It is located near Liberty Heights Avenue and Hilton Street, and is characterized by a few large Victorian mansions interspersed among row houses.

It has been home to many prominent African Americans, including former Baltimore mayors Catherine Pugh,  Kurt L. Schmoke, State Senator Lisa Gladden, and State Delegate Shawn Z. Tarrant. Benjamin Jealous, former NAACP president and chief executive officer, traveled as a child from northern California to spend his summers here with his maternal grandparents. Former Baltimore mayor Stephanie Rawlings-Blake, former Clerk of the Court Frank M. Conaway Sr., and attorney Dwight Pettit grew up in this neighborhood as children. Civil Rights activist, Walter P. Carter moved his family to Ashburton in 1965.  His daughter, State Senator Jill P. Carter grew up there and represents the area as senator for Maryland Legislative District 41. The Carter family retains the family home on Egerton Road.

History
In the 1920s, racially and religiously exclusionary covenants were used to exclude Black and Jewish people from Ashburton, which was then a predominantly white Christian neighborhood. By 1929, the Maryland Court of Appeals found these discriminatory covenants to be void. Between the 1930s and 1940s, the neighborhood began to religiously integrate as Jews began to move in. By the 1950s and 1960s, the neighborhood's demographics began to change again as Ashburton shifted to a majority African-American community.

See also
 List of Baltimore neighborhoods

References

External links
 Northwest District maps

African-American history in Baltimore
African-American upper class
Forest Park, Baltimore
Historic Jewish communities in the United States
Jews and Judaism in Baltimore
Neighborhoods in Baltimore
Northwest Baltimore